The County of Guastalla was a feudal state in northern Italy, centered on Guastalla. The title of count was created in 1406 for Guido Torelli.

History 
The Torelli family ruled Guastalla until 1539 when it was purchased by Ferrante Gonzaga. Another branch of the Torelli family held the County of Montechiarugolo, which was created in 1456 from a split in the County of Guastalla, until 1612.

Ferrante Gonzaga's descendants ruled Guastalla until 1746, being raised to the title of duke in 1621 when the territory became the Duchy of Guastalla. The last Gonzaga duke, Giuseppe Gonzaga, died heirless in 1746, at which point the territory was briefly incorporated into Austrian Lombardy.

With the Treaty of Aix-la-Chapelle in 1748, Guastalla was ceded to the Duke of Parma.

See also
 Guastalla
 Duchy of Guastalla
 List of rulers of Guastalla
 Duchy of Parma
 House of Gonzaga
 County of Montechiarugolo
 List of historic states of Italy

Counties of the Holy Roman Empire
Italian states
States and territories established in 1406
1621 disestablishments in the Holy Roman Empire
1400s establishments in the Holy Roman Empire
1406 establishments in Europe
County of Guastalla
County of Guastalla
Former monarchies of Europe